Jean-Michel Sénégal (born 5 June 1953) is a French basketball player. He competed in the men's tournament at the 1984 Summer Olympics.

References

1953 births
Living people
French men's basketball players
AS Monaco Basket coaches
Limoges CSP coaches
Olympic basketball players of France
Basketball players at the 1984 Summer Olympics
Sportspeople from Lyon
20th-century French people
21st-century French people